The Red Maple Leaf is a 2016 Canadian-American crime drama film written and directed by Frank D'Angelo and starring James Caan, Robert Loggia, Martin Landau, Paul Sorvino, Kris Kristofferson, and Mira Sorvino. The film is dedicated to the memory of Loggia and Doris Roberts. The film marked Landau's final on-screen appearance as he died 10 months after its release.

Plot

The film starts in Ottawa, where Jennie Adams, daughter of U.S. Ambassador Patrick Adams, and the granddaughter of Senator George Record, goes missing during her Secret Service detail.

While the two nations fight over jurisdiction, the case grows cold. Seasoned veteran detective Alfonso Palermo puts everything else aside—his emotions, his alcoholism, his tact—to step up and search for the little girl and return her to her family.

As the mystery unravels we learn that Alfonso has felt similar pain and loss. He lost his wife and daughter in a car accident as well, and his diligence stems from the fact that he doesn't want anyone to feel that kind of pain ever again.

Alfonso establishes himself and his partner Robert Santos as lead investigators on the case on behalf of the Canadian government, and they proceed to interview Jennie's parents (the US Ambassador and his wife) and his P.A. Marie MacDonald. The President calls the director to put pressure on the investigation.

They all visit the crime scene looking for clues, and Al's "old school" ways seem to irritate his American counterparts. He visits a nearby bar in search of clues and quizzes Maggie the waitress. He thinks one of the protagonists was there and declares it a crime scene. Much to the annoyance of the Americans, he finds a clue on the floor that supports his theory.

On instructions from the Director, Alfonso goes to L.A. to interview Mrs. Stewart, who is having an affair with the Ambassador. He visits the Ambassador's parents who aren't happy that the Canadians are running the investigation, and she rings the President to complain. His mother thinks he is a saint, but his father's opinion is a little less flattering. He's invited to visit the Senator who tricks him into revealing he has a drinking problem.

Al flies back to Canada, where he and Robert visit a disco and arrest Daniel Barton, whom they suspect of being involved with the abduction. He is subsequently released with conditions.

Al goes to see Mrs. Adams in the Big Red Steakhouse at her request, but it is not entirely clear why she wants to see him. As the investigation continues it appears that the Ambassador is not as popular with his family and people who know him as he purports to be and that his marriage is on the verge of collapse.

Al and Robert visit Bernard Florence, who used to drive for the Ambassador, and may have an insight into the investigation. Meanwhile, the FBI engages the services of a psychic without much success.

Al goes home where he sees a vision of his wife and whilst looking at a picture of his daughter.

They go to see Sheriff Williams at the NYMPH in Niagara Falls after a lead suggests charges against the Ambassador were mysteriously dropped due to a phone call from the top.

Forensics reveal that bubble wrap from an alley at the crime scene and the local bar across the road are an exact match.

Al goes to his local bar the Blind Swine, where he reminisces about losing his family and turns to the bottle, his friends rally around him and stop him before he goes too far. His Dad, the Director, and the Senator get involved due to concerns about his behaviour, and he is referred to Dr. Amanda Walker for therapy. Bernard Florence calls Al and recalls an incident back when he was the Ambassador's driver, and a comment was made by the Ambassador after his P.A. Marie MacDonald gave him oral sex in the back of his car, the comment was about their future and his daughter "being in the way".

They visit the P.A.'s house and question her, and she reveals that she has kidnapped the Ambassador's daughter and is hiding her in a warehouse. He tells Robert to arrest her and take her back to jail, and then after letting the Senator and everybody know he heads over there to look for her.

His Dad meets him at the warehouse and they break in and start searching for the missing girl. After seeing a vision of his dead wife Mira Al finds her drugged in a barrel and takes her outside in his arms to a waiting cheering crowd. When Al is walking away he sees another vision of his wife.

Cast

Production
The film was shot in Hamilton, Ontario and Los Angeles, California.

References

External links
 
 
 

2016 films
Canadian crime drama films
American crime drama films
Films shot in Hamilton, Ontario
Films directed by Frank D'Angelo
English-language Canadian films
2010s English-language films
2010s Canadian films
2010s American films